Barry Williams is an English-born former professional rugby league footballer who played in the 1990s.

Background
Barry Williams was born in Great Broughton, Cumberland, England.

Club career
A wonderfully talented ball-playing forward, Williams played a prominent role as Carlisle beat Castleford in the 1995–96 Regal Trophy match. A season earlier, he had helped Workington Town finish ninth in the old first division. In 1997 he turned down a move to Leeds Rhinos in order to have another spell at Workington Town.

International honours
Barry Williams won caps for Wales while at 1991…1994 4-caps 1-try 4-points.

References

External links
(archived by web.archive.org) Wales 35 France 6 Vetch Field, Swansea
Alvis injects life
Rugby League: Tuuta appeal rejected
It's six of the Bebb

Living people
Carlisle RLFC players
Cumbria rugby league team players
English rugby league players
Rugby league players from Broughton, Cumbria
Place of birth missing (living people)
Rugby league hookers
Wales national rugby league team players
Workington Town players
Year of birth missing (living people)